Nagarahole National Park is a national park located in Kodagu district and Mysore district in Karnataka, India.

This park was declared the 37th Tiger Reserve of India in 1999. It is part of the Nilgiri Biosphere Reserve.

The park has rich forest cover, small streams, hills, valleys and waterfalls, and populations of Bengal tiger, gaur, Indian elephant, Indian leopard, chital and Sambar deer.

Geography
The park ranges the foothills of the Western Ghats spreading down the Brahmagiri hills and south towards Kerala state. It lies between the latitudes 12°15'37.69"N and longitudes 76°17'34.4"E. The park covers  located to the north-west of Bandipur National Park. The Kabini reservoir separates the two parks.

Together with the adjoining Bandipur National Park, Mudumalai National Park and Wayanad Wildlife Sanctuary, it forms the largest protected area in Southern India, totalling .

Climate and ecology
Its water sources include the Lakshmmantirtha river, Sarati Hole, Nagar Hole, Balle Halla, Kabini River, four perennial streams, 47 seasonal streams, four small perennial lakes, 41 artificial tanks, several swamps, Taraka Dam and the Kabini reservoir.

History
The park derives its name from naga, meaning snake and hole, referring to streams. The park was an exclusive hunting reserve of the kings of the Wodeyar dynasty, the former rulers of the Kingdom of Mysore. It was upgraded into a national park in 1988. The park was declared a tiger reserve in 1999.

Flora

The vegetation here consists mainly of North Western Ghats moist deciduous forests with teak (Tectona grandis) and roseta rosewood (Dalbergia latifolia) predominating in the southern parts.

There is the Central Deccan Plateau dry deciduous forests with Pala indigo (Wrightia tinctoria) and thorny wattles (acacia) towards the east. There are some sub-montane valley freshwater swamp forests with several Eugenia species. The main trees are the commercially important rosewood, sandalwood, teak and silver oak.

Trees of the dry deciduous forest include crocodile bark (Terminalia elliptica), crêpe myrtle (Lagerstroemia indica), Indian kino (Pterocarpus marsupium), Grewia tiliifolia and axlewood (Anogeissus latifolia).

Species growing in the understorey include Kydia calycina, Indian gooseberry (Phyllanthus emblica) and beechwood (Gmelina arborea), shrubs like horse nettles (Solanum), tick clover (Desmodium), Helicteres and invasive species like Lantana camara and bonesets (Eupatorium).

These forests have some conspicuous tree species such as golden shower (Cassia fistula), flame-of-the-forest (Butea monosperma) and clumping bamboo (Dendrocalamus strictus).

Fauna

Mammals 

The big predators in the park are Bengal tiger (Panthera tigris tigris), Indian leopard (Panthera pardus fusca), dhole (Cuon alpinus), Indian jackal (Canis aureus indicus) and sloth bear (Melursus ursinus).

Large herbivores include Indian elephant (Elephas maximus indicus), gaur (Bos gaurus), sambar (Cervus unicolor), chital (Axis axis), barking deer (Muntiacus muntjak), four-horned antelope (Tetracercus quadricornis) and wild boar (Sus scrofa).

Arboreal mammals include gray langur (Presbytes entellus), bonnet macaque (Macaca radiata), red slender loris (Loris tadigradus), red giant flying squirrel (Petaurista petaurista), Indian giant flying squirrel (Petaurista philippensis) and Indian giant squirrel (Ratufa indica).

Small predators include jungle cat (Felis chaus), leopard cat (Prionailurus bengalensis), small Indian civet (Viverricula indica), Asian palm civet (Paradoxurus hermaphroditus), Indian grey mongoose (Urva edwardsi), Indian brown mongoose (Urva fuscua), stripe-necked mongoose (Urva vitticolla) and Eurasian otter (Lutra lutra).

Other mammals include Indian spotted chevrotain (Moschiola indica), Indian hare (Lepus nigricollis), Indian pangolin (Manis crassicaudata) and Indian crested porcupine (Hystrix indica).

Birds 

Over 250 species of birds live in Nagarhole National Park. Besides the enormous variety of woodland birds, there are large congregations of waterfowl in the Kabini river. Birds range from blue-bearded bee-eater and scarlet minivet to the more common osprey, herons and ducks. Recognised as an Important Bird Area, the park has over 270 species of birds, including the white-rumped vulture (Gyps bengalensis), lesser adjutant (Leptopilos javanicus), greater spotted eagle (Clanga clanga) and Nilgiri wood pigeon (Columba elphinstonii).

Near threatened species like Oriental darter (Anhniga melanogaster), black-headed ibis (Threskiornis melanocephalus), grey-headed fish eagle (Haliaeetus ichthyaetus) and red-headed vulture (Sarcogyps calvus) also occur.

Endemic species include the blue-winged parakeet (Psittacula columboides), Malabar grey hornbill (Ocyceros griseus), white-bellied treepie (Dendrocitta leucogastra), white-cheeked barbet (Psilopogon viridis), Indian scimitar babbler (Pomatorhinus horsfieldii), Malabar trogon (Harpactes fasciatus) and Malabar whistling thrush (Myophonus horsfieldii).

Birds seen in drier regions include painted bush quail (Perdicula erythrorhyncha), Sirkeer malkoha (Taccocua leschenaultii), ashy prinia (Prinia socialis), Indian robin (Copsychus fulicatus), Indian peafowl (Pavo cristatus) and yellow-footed green pigeon (Treron phonyceptaurus).

Reptiles and amphibians 
Common reptiles include the mugger crocodile (Crocodylus palustris), Asian vine snake (Ahaetulla genus), Indian wolf snake (Lycodon aulicus), Oriental ratsnake (Ptyas mucosa), bamboo pit viper (Craspedocephalus gramineus), Russell's viper (Daboia russellii), common krait (Bungarus caeruleus), Indian python (Python molurus), Bengal monitor (Varanus bengalensis).

Amphibians include Chunam tree frog (Polypedates maculatus), green pond frog (Euphlyctis hexadactylus), golden bullfrog (Hoplobatrachus tigerinus) and Asian common toad (Duttaphrynus melanostictus).

Insects 
Extensive studies on the biodiversity of the insect population have been carried out by researchers from the Ashoka Trust for Research in Ecology and the Environment, Bangalore. The insect biodiversity of this park includes over 96 species of dung beetles and 60 species of ants. Unusual species of ants that have been identified, including the jumping ants such as Harpegnathos saltator, which are known to jump up to a metre high.

The ant species Tetraponera rufonigra may be useful as a marker for the forest health because these ants feed on termites and are abundant in places where there are many dead trees. Identified dung beetles include India's largest beetle Onthophagus dama, Heliocopris dominus which breeds only in elephant dung, and Onthophagus pactolus, a rare species of dung beetle.

Tribal and native inhabitants
The Jenu Kurubas, primary inhabitants of this forest area, are a tribe in Karnataka state and their traditional practices and rituals are slowly disappearing. The government is restricting their entry inside the National park and forest due to multiple factors including but not limited conservation efforts and bringing the community to the mainstream society.

The Ministry of Home Affairs, Government of India, identified the Jenu Kuruba and the Koraga as tribal groups in Karnataka. The Jenu Kurubas are traditional food gatherers and honey collectors. In Kannada, the term 'Jenu' means 'honey' and the term 'kuruba' generally mean 'shepherd'. It is derived from the Kannada word 'kuri' which means 'sheep'. The term kuruba is also associated with non-shepherd communities. They speak a variant form of Kannada commonly known as Jenu-nudi within their family kin group, and Kannada with others. They use Kannada script. According to the Census of 1981, the population of Jenu Kuruba community is 34,747 out of which 17,867 are male and 16,880 are female.

Relocation efforts
In the last decade there has been enormous activity undertaken both by the Government and NGOs to relocate tribal people to the periphery of the forests. The relocation efforts are part of a larger focus to conserve the existing tiger population and elephant habitat, which were under serious threat due to change in lifestyles of the tribal residents within the forests. There has been much resistance to relocation efforts from the tribal groups. Many schools and houses have been built with basic amenities like lighting, hospitals and roads to support the relocated tribal population.

Threats and conservation efforts
Threats to the national park come from a large-scale cutting of sandalwood and teak trees. Timber smuggling, especially sandalwood smuggling, happens quite extensively here. Timber felling has been reported from plantation areas in Kollihadi, Vadodara Modu, Tattikere in Veerahosanahalli, and Mettiupe in Kalahari. Other places where timber felling has been reported include Arekatti, Badrikatte, Bidurukatte, Veerana Hosahalli, and Marhigodu ranges. In July 2002  hundreds of trees were cut down in the Veeranahosalli range.

A study carried out between 1996 and 1997 revealed that hunting was the biggest threat to wildlife in Kudremukh and Nagarhole National Parks. The survey carried out on 49 actives and 19 retired hunters revealed that 26 species of wildlife were hunted at an average intensity of 216 hunter days per month per village. As much as 48% of the hunters reported hunting for the 'thrill'. The study showed that in Nagarhole, 16 mammal species weighing over 1 kg were regularly hunted with shotguns and also by traditional methods used by tribal communities.

Poaching of birds and other mammals is another serious issue. A high number of elephant deaths have been reported from this park, with nearly 100 elephants dying between 1991–92 and 2004–05 in the Kodagu and Hunsur Forest Division (PA Update 2005). Elephants are killed for their ivory. A study carried out by Wildlife First! found that nearly 77 elephants were reported dead between 1 January 2000 and 31 October 2002. Another study carried out by the Institute for Natural Resources, Conservation, Education, Research and Training (INSERT) in 2002 revealed that as many as seven elephants had been killed earlier that year.

A report submitted by the Project Tiger Steering Committee stated that barely 25% of the park's staff were involved in vigilance work, thus putting the park at high risk of both, poaching and tree felling. Irregular payment to the forestry staff has been reported in both Bandipur and Nagarhole National Parks and there have also been reports of improper use of project funds.

Huge trees were reduced to cinder. Burnt remains of snakes, monitor lizards, giant Malabar squirrels lay scattered on the charred remains of what was once a verdant patch of moist-deciduous forest.
Forest fires and seasonal droughts coupled with water shortage have caused many wild animals to migrate to other greener spaces.

Human-wildlife conflicts due to raids by wild animals and elephants on nearby villages along with the consequent retaliation by the villagers is another important threat to the parks wildlife. In 2001, the Karnataka state government sanctioned Rs 2 crores to dig elephant proof trenches and install solar fencing around the park to prevent elephants from straying into the farmer's fields.

In 1997, tribal activist groups won public interest litigation in the Karnataka High Court to halt the setting up of a resort called the Gateway Tusker Lodge planned to be set up by the Taj Group of Hotels. With nearly 125 villages present inside the park, NGOs actively working to protect the tribal communities include, Living Inspiration for Tribals (LIFT), Coorg Organisation of Rural Development (CORD), DEED, FEDINA-VIKASA and Nagarhole Budakattu Janara Hakkustapana Samithi. In 2000, the first relocation attempts initiated by a World Bank-funded eco-development project of the local tribal population was begun with 50 tribal people. The relocated families were given land possession certificates for five acres of land and houses at Veeranahosalli, near Hunsur. The state and union government planned to relocate 1,550 tribal families at a cost of 155 million.

See also
 D.B.Kuppe
 Mananthavady Road

References

Literature
 K K Gurung & Raj Singh: Field Guide to the Mammals of the Indian Subcontinent, Academic Press, San Diego, 
 William Riley, laura Riley: Nature's Strongholds. The World's Great Wildlife Reserves. Princeton University Press, 2005. 

Kazmierczak, K. 2000. A field guide to the birds of India, Sri Lanka, Pakistan, Nepal, Bhutan, Bangladesh and the Maldives. OM Book Service, New Delhi, India. 352 pp.
Menon, V. 2003. A field guide to Indian mammals. DK (India) Pvt Ltd and Penguin Book India (P) Ltd. 201 pp.

External links
 
 
 Nagarhole tiger reserve blog
 Wildlife Times: Article on Predators of Nagarahole (archived 17 May 2007)
 Wildlife Times: The Annual Elephant Symposium (archived 24 June 2006)
 Wildlifetimes.com Wildlife Photography
 Wildlife Times: Elephant Migration to Kabini (archived 24 June 2006)

Tiger reserves of India
National parks in Karnataka
Protected areas established in 1955
Tourist attractions in Kodagu district
Tourist attractions in Mysore district
1955 establishments in Mysore State
South Western Ghats moist deciduous forests